Bijela is a large village in Bosnia and Herzegovina located approximately 25 kilometers south of the city of Brčko on the Brčko - Banovići railway line.  It has approximately 2000 inhabitants and is the largest village in the Brčko District. A hill above the village is the site of some Stećci.

Demographics 
According to the 2013 census, its population was 1,923.

References

Villages in Brčko District